Greater Love Hath No Man is a 1911 silent film short directed by Alice Guy and produced by the Solax Company.

It is preserved in the Library of Congress.

This film was one of several films by Alice Guy Blache digitally restored for the Alice Guy Blache Retrospective at the Whitney Museum of American Art that ran from November 6, 2009 to January 24, 2010.

References

External links
Greater Love Hath No Man at IMDb.com

1911 films
American silent short films
Films directed by Alice Guy-Blaché
American black-and-white films
1911 short films
1911 drama films
Silent American drama films
1910s American films